Inn of the Sinful Daughters (German: Das Wirtshaus der sündigen Töchter) is a 1978 West German sex comedy film directed by Walter Boos and starring Gina Janssen, Dagobert Walter and Claus Richt. The plot is inspired by the play Kohlhiesel's Daughters by Hanns Kräly, one of numerous films to use the storyline.

Cast
 Gina Janssen as Lilli/Christl 
 Dagobert Walter as Flori 
 Claus Richt as Rudi 
 Dorle Buchner as Barbara 
 Eva Gross as Helga Huber 
 Kalle Möllmann as Billy 
 Peter Linow as Götz 
 Robert Seidl as Franzl 
 Jacques Herlin as Maxi Huber 'Immobilien-Huber' 
 Claus Sasse
 Rainer Häuselmayer as Knecht 
 Minja Vojvodić
 Gaby Mayser
 Sylvia Engelmann as Mädchen in Disco
 Margitta Hofer as Federballspielerin 
 Ingeborg Moosholzer as Restaurantgast

References

Bibliography 
 Ludewig, Alexandra. Screening Nostalgia: 100 Years of German Heimat Film. transcript Verlag, 2014.

External links 
 

1978 films
1970s sex comedy films
German sex comedy films
West German films
1970s German-language films
Films directed by Walter Boos
Films set in Bavaria
1978 comedy films
1970s German films